The 1947–48 Ohio Bobcats men's basketball team represented Ohio University in the college basketball season of 1947–48. The team was coached by Dutch Trautwein and played their home games at the Men's Gymnasium.  They finished the season 10–10.  They finished third in the Mid-American Conference with a conference record of 4–4.

Schedule

|-
!colspan=9 style=| Regular Season

 Source:

Statistics

Team Statistics
Final 1947–48 Statistics

Source

Player statistics

Source

References

Ohio Bobcats men's basketball seasons
Ohio
1947 in sports in Ohio
1948 in sports in Ohio